Intersex people are born with sex characteristics, such as chromosomes, gonads, or genitals that, according to the UN Office of the High Commissioner for Human Rights, "do not fit typical binary notions of male or female bodies". "Because their bodies are seen as different, intersex children and adults are often stigmatized and subjected to multiple human rights violations".

Discriminatory treatment includes infanticide, abandonment, mutilation and neglect, as well as broader concerns regarding the right to life. Intersex people face discrimination in education, employment, healthcare, sport, with an impact on mental and physical health, and on poverty levels, including as a result of harmful medical practices.

United Nations, African Commission on Human and Peoples' Rights, Council of Europe, Inter-American Commission on Human Rights, and other human rights institutions have called for countries to ban discrimination and combat stigma. Few countries so far protect intersex people from discrimination.

Protection from discrimination 

A 2013 first international pilot study, Human Rights between the Sexes, by Dan Christian Ghattas, found that intersex people are discriminated against worldwide: "Intersex individuals are considered individuals with a 'disorder' in all areas in which Western medicine prevails. They are more or less obviously treated as sick or 'abnormal', depending on the respective society."

The United Nations states that intersex people suffer stigma on the basis of physical characteristics, "including violations of their rights to health and physical integrity, to be free from torture and ill-treatment, and to equality and non- discrimination." The UN has called for governments to end discrimination against intersex people:

A handful of jurisdictions so far provide explicit protection from discrimination for intersex people:

 South Africa was the first country to explicitly add intersex to legislation, as part of the attribute of 'sex'. 
 Australia was the first country to add an independent attribute, of 'intersex status'. 
 Malta was the first to adopt a broader framework of "sex characteristics", through legislation that also ended modifications to the sex characteristics of minors undertaken for social and cultural reasons. 
 Since then, several countries in Southeastern Europe have prohibited discrimination based on sex characteristics of intersex status: Albania (since 2020), Bosnia and Herzegovina (since 2016), Greece (since 2015), and Serbia (since 2021) currently prohibit discrimination based on "sex characteristics", while Montenegro prohibits discrimination based on "intersex characteristics" since 2017. 
 Iceland bans employment discrimination based on sex characteristics since 2018. The Netherlands (since 2019), Belgium (since 2020) and Denmark (since 2022) also prohibit discrimination based on sex characteristics. 
Pakistan prohibits discrimination against intersex people (khusra) since 2018. India also prohibits discrimination against "person with intersex variations" since 2020. 
 Since 2022, Chile is the first Latin American country that provide legal protection from discrimination based on sex characteristics.

Right to life 

Intersex people face genetic de-selection via pregnancy terminations and preimplantation genetic diagnosis, as well as abandonment, neglect, infanticide and murder due to their sex characteristics. In 2015, the Council of Europe published an Issue Paper on Human rights and intersex people, remarking:

In 2015, Chinese news reported a case of abandonment of an infant, thought likely due to its sex characteristics. Hong Kong activist Small Luk reports that this is not uncommon, in part due to the historic imposition of a policy of one child per family. Cases of infanticide, attempted infanticide, and neglect have been reported in China, Uganda and Pakistan.

Kenyan reports suggest that the birth of an intersex infant may be viewed as a curse. In 2015, it was reported that an intersex Kenyan adolescent, Muhadh Ishmael, was mutilated and later died. Ishmael had previously been described as a curse on his family.

Medical 

In places with accessible healthcare systems, intersex people face harmful practices including involuntary or coercive treatment, and in places without such systems, infanticide, abandonment and mutilation may occur.

Physical integrity and bodily autonomy 
Intersex people face involuntary or coerced medical treatment from infancy. Where these occur without personal informed consent, these are "violations of their rights to health and physical integrity, to be free from torture and ill-treatment, and to equality and non-discrimination."

A 2016 Australian study of 272 people born with atypical sex characteristics found that 60% had received medical treatment on the basis of their sex characteristics, half receiving such treatments aged under 18 years, "most commonly genital surgeries (many of which occurred in infancy) and hormone treatments", and the "majority experienced at least one negative impact". Overall, while some parents and physicians had attempted to empower participants, the study found "strong evidence suggesting a pattern of institutionalised shaming and coercive treatment" and poor (or no) information provision. 16% of study participants were not provided with information on options of having no treatment, and some were provided with misinformation about the nature of their treatment, and information about peer support was also lacking. OII Europe reports:

Rationales for medical intervention frequently focus on parental distress, or problematize future gender identity and sexuality, and subjective judgements are made about the acceptability of risk of future gender dysphoria. Medical professionals have traditionally considered the worst outcomes after genital reconstruction in infancy to occur when the person develops a gender identity discordant with the sex assigned as an infant. Human rights institutions question such approaches as being "informed by redundant social constructs around gender and biology".

Decision-making on any cancer and other physical risks may be intertwined with "normalizing" rationales. In a major Parliamentary report in Australia, published in October 2013, the Senate Community Affairs References committee was "disturbed" by the possible implications of current practices in the treatment of cancer risk. The committee stated: "clinical intervention pathways stated to be based on probabilities of cancer risk may be encapsulating treatment decisions based on other factors, such as the desire to conduct normalising surgery... Treating cancer may be regarded as unambiguously therapeutic treatment, while normalising surgery may not. Thus basing a decision on cancer risk might avoid the need for court oversight in a way that a decision based on other factors might not. The committee is disturbed by the possible implications of this..."

Despite the naming of clinician statements as "consensus" statements, there remains no clinical consensus about the conduct of surgical interventions, nor their evidence base, surgical timing, necessity, type of surgical intervention, and degree of difference warranting intervention. Surgery may adversely impact physical sensation and capacity for intimacy; however, research has suggested that parents are willing to consent to appearance-altering surgeries even at the cost of later adult sexual sensation. Other research shows that parents may make different choices with non-medicalized information. Child rights experts suggest that parents have no right to consent to such treatments.

Clinical decision-making is frequently portrayed as a choice between early or later surgical interventions, while human rights advocates and some clinicians portray concerns as matters of consent and autonomy.

Medical photography and display 

Photographs of intersex children's genitalia are circulated in medical communities for documentary purposes, and individuals with intersex traits may be subjected to repeated genital examinations and display to medical teams. Sharon Preves described this as a form of humiliation and stigmatization, leading to an "inability to deflect negative associations of self" where "genitalia must be revealed in order to allow for stigmatization". According to Creighton et al, the "experience of being photographed has exemplified for many people with intersex conditions the powerlessness and humiliation felt during medical investigations and interventions".

Access to medical services 

Adults with intersex variations report poor mental health due to experiences of medicalization, with many individuals avoiding care as a result. Many Australian study participants stated a need to educate their physicians. Similar reports are made elsewhere: reports on the situation in Mexico suggests that adults may not receive adequate care, including lack of understanding about intersex bodies and examinations that cause physical harm.

In countries without accessible healthcare systems, infanticide, abandonment and mutilation may occur. Access to necessary medical services, for example due to cancer or urinary issues, is also limited.

Inciting hate crimes by allegations of sex crimes 
One increasingly common cause of hate crimes against intersex people is the neurological claim that male and female brains have fundamentally different sexualities, in particular the claim that men are sexually impulsive and aggressive and bound to act on their sexual fantasies while most women are said to have a wider range of sexual fantasies than most men, including fantasies that it would be unacceptable to act on. The claim that a combination of one trait that most men have and one trait that most women have would produce a sex criminal adds up to allegations that intersex people are sex offenders. To decrease such severe discrimination against intersex people, some researchers advocate more public information about the error sources in the sexological studies that are said to show such sex differences. This includes the possibility that societal double standards may scare more men than women into not talking about or otherwise revealing their sex fantasies (corroborated by the existence of characteristics that differ between male volunteers and male nonvolunteers, but not between female volunteers and female nonvolunteers, in erotica research) giving a false appearance of men having narrower ranges of sexual fantasies than women, and the possibility that men who want to be castrated out of their spiritual beliefs may have to commit sex crimes and claim that it was due to uncontrollable urges to get castrated since such surgery is not off the shelf (corroborated by the overrepresentation of religious groups in child sexual abuse scandals that cannot be explained by biopsychiatric correlations) creating a false appearance of men being less able to control their sexual impulses than women. Certain intersex rights advocates argue that this may dispel the myth that intersex people are "hybrid degenerated" to be sex criminals, creating more understanding for intersex people.

Suicide and self-harm 

The impact of discrimination and stigma can also be seen in high rates of suicidal tendencies and self harm. Multiple anecdotal reports, including from Hong Kong and Kenya point to high levels of suicidality amongst intersex people. The Australian sociological study of 272 people born with atypical sex characteristics found that 60% had thought about suicide, and 42% thought about self-harm, "on the basis of issues related to having an intersex variation ... 19% had attempted suicide"; causes identified included stigma, discrimination, family rejection and school bullying.

A 2013 German clinical study found high rates of distress, with "prevalence rates of self-harming behavior and suicidal tendencies ... comparable to traumatized women with a history of physical or sexual abuse." Similar results have been reported in Australia and Denmark.

Education 

An Australian sociological survey of 272 persons born with atypical sex characteristics, published in 2016, found that 18% of respondents (compared to an Australian average of 2%) failed to complete secondary school, with early school leaving coincident with pubertal medical interventions, bullying on the basis of physical characteristics, and other factors. A Kenyan news report suggests high rates of early school leaving, with the organisation Gama Africa reporting that 60% of 132 known intersex people had dropped out of school "because of the harassment and treatment they received from their peers and their teachers".

The Australian study found that schools lacked inclusive services such as relevant puberty and sex education curricula and counselling, for example, not representing a full range of human bodily diversity. Only a quarter of respondents felt positive about their schooling experiences, schooling coincided with disclosure of an intersex condition, associated with well-being risks, and early school leaving peaked "during the years most associated with puberty and hormone therapy interventions". Cognitive differences may also be associated with some traits such as sex chromosome variations. Nevertheless, in addition to very high rates of early school leaving, the Australian study also found that a higher proportion of study participants completed undergraduate or postgraduate degrees compared to the general Australian population.

Poverty and employment discrimination 

The impact of discrimination and stigma can be seen in high rates of poverty. A 2015 Australian survey of people born with atypical sex characteristics found high levels of poverty, in addition to very high levels of early school leaving, and higher than average rates of disability. 6% of the 272 survey participants reported being homeless or couch surfing.

OII Europe states that "stigma, structural and verbal discrimination, harassment" as well as harmful practices and lack of legal recognition can lead to "inadequate education, broken careers and poverty (including homelessness) due to pathologisation and related trauma, a disturbed family life due to taboo and medicalisation, lack of self-esteem and a high risk of becoming suicidal."

An Employers guide to intersex inclusion published by Pride in Diversity and Organisation Intersex International Australia discloses cases of discrimination in employment.

Legal 

Like all individuals, some intersex individuals may be raised as a particular sex (male or female) but then identify with another later in life, while most do not. Like non-intersex people, some intersex individuals may not identify themselves as either exclusively female or exclusively male. A 2012 clinical review suggests that between 8.5–20% of persons with intersex conditions may experience gender dysphoria, while sociological research in Australia, a country with a third 'X' sex classification, shows that 19% of people born with atypical sex characteristics selected an "X" or "other" option, while 52% are women, 23% men and 6% unsure.

Depending on the jurisdiction, access to any birth certificate may be an issue, including a birth certificate with a sex marker. The Asia Pacific Forum of National Human Rights Institutions states that:

Access to a birth certificate with a correct sex marker may be an issue for people who do not identify with their sex assigned at birth, or it may only be available accompanied by surgical requirements.

The passports and identification documents of Australia and some other nationalities have adopted "X" as a valid third category besides "M" (male) and "F" (female), at least since 2003. In 2013, Germany became the first European nation to allow babies with characteristics of both sexes to be registered as indeterminate gender on birth certificates, amidst opposition and skepticism from intersex organisations who point out that the law appears to mandate exclusion from male or female categories. The Council of Europe acknowledged this approach, and concerns about recognition of third and blank classifications in a 2015 Issue Paper, stating that these may lead to "forced outings" and "lead to an increase in pressure on parents of intersex children to decide in favour of one sex." The Issue Paper argues that "further reflection on non-binary legal identification is necessary".

Sport 

Women who have, or are perceived to have intersex traits are subject to stigmatization, humiliation and trial by media. Currently suspended IAAF regulations on hyperandrogenism "mandated that national Olympic committees 'actively investigate any perceived deviation in sex characteristics'" in women athletes.

In 2013, it was disclosed in a medical journal that four unnamed elite female athletes from developing countries were subjected to gonadectomies (sterilization) and partial clitoridectomies (female genital mutilation) after testosterone testing revealed that they had an intersex condition. Testosterone testing was introduced in the wake of the Caster Semenya case, of a South African runner subjected to testing due to her appearance and vigor. There is no evidence that innate hyperandrogenism in elite women athletes confers an advantage in sport. While Australia protects intersex persons from discrimination, the Act contains an exemption in sport.

LGBT 

Intersex people may face discrimination within LGBT settings and multiple organizations have highlighted appeals to LGBT rights recognition that fail to address the issue of unnecessary "normalising" treatments on intersex children, using the portmanteau term "pinkwashing".

Emi Koyama has described how inclusion of intersex in LGBTI can fail to address intersex-specific human rights issues, including creating false impressions "that intersex people's rights are protected" by laws protecting LGBT people, and failing to acknowledge that many intersex people are not LGBT. Julius Kaggwa of SIPD Uganda has written that, while the gay community "offers us a place of relative safety, it is also oblivious to our specific needs". Mauro Cabral has written that transgender people and organizations "need to stop approaching intersex issues as if they were trans issues" including use of intersex as a means of explaining being transgender; "we can collaborate a lot with the intersex movement by making it clear how wrong that approach is".

Organisation Intersex International Australia states that some intersex individuals are same sex attracted, and some are heterosexual, but "LGBTI activism has fought for the rights of people who fall outside of expected binary sex and gender norms" but, in June 2016, the same organization pointed to contradictory statements by Australian governments, suggesting that the dignity and rights of LGBTI (LGBT and intersex) people are recognized while, at the same time, harmful practices on intersex children continue.

In August 2016, Zwischengeschlecht described actions to promote equality or civil status legislation without action on banning "intersex genital mutilations" as a form of pinkwashing. The organization has previously highlighted evasive government statements to UN Treaty Bodies that conflate intersex, transgender and LGBT issues, instead of addressing harmful practices on infants.

Protections and rights by continent and jurisdiction

See also
Intersex human rights
Intersex medical interventions
Intersex rights by country
Legal recognition of intersex people
Sexual characteristics

Notes

Intersex discrimination
Intersex rights
Discrimination against LGBT people